Alexander Triantis is a Canadian academic administrator serving as dean of the Johns Hopkins Carey Business School since 2019. He was dean of the Robert H. Smith School of Business from 2013 to 2019. He is the board chair-elect of the Association to Advance Collegiate Schools of Business.

Triantis' father was a professor of economics. He took his first college math class at the University of Toronto at the age of 13. He completed a B.A.Sc. and M.Eng. from the University of Toronto. He completed a M.S. and Ph.D. in industrial engineering with a specialization in finance from Stanford University.

References 

Living people
Year of birth missing (living people)
Place of birth missing (living people)
Johns Hopkins University faculty
University of Maryland, College Park faculty
University of Toronto alumni
Stanford University alumni
Canadian emigrants to the United States
American university and college faculty deans